The annual election to Swansea County Borough Council took place in November 1890. It was followed by the 1891 election. Only three of the wards were contested.

Ward Results

Alexandra

Brynmelin

Castle

East

Ffynone

Landore

Morriston

St Helen's

St John's (three seats)

Victoria (one seat)

References

1890
Swansea County Borough
19th century in Swansea